Bhaag Saale is an upcoming Indian Telugu-language crime comedy film directed by Praneeth Sai. It is produced by Vedaansh Creative Works, in association with Big Ben Cinemas and Cine Valley Movies. It stars Sri Simha, Neha Solanki, Rajeev Kanakala, Nandini Rai, and Harsha Chemudu. 

The title and first look of the film were released on 7th October 2021. The film has music composed by Kaala Bhairava.

Premise 
The film revolves around the story of lead role going to any extent inorder to be successful in life.

Cast 

 Sri Simha
 Neha Solanki
 Nandini Rai
 Rajeev Kanakala
 John Vijay
 Varshini Sounderajan
 Harsha Chemudu

Production

Development 
The title and first look of the film were announced on 7th October 2022 and has reportedly wrapped up the shoot and is in the final stage of post production.

Cast and crew 
Sri Simha and Neha Solanki play the lead roles and John Vijay Rajeev Kanakala and Nandini Rai are few among the supporting cast. Kaala Bhairava, the music director of the film is a sibling of Sri Simha and son of Indian music director M. M. Keeravani

Music 
The music rights of the film is owned by Aditya Music. Kaala Bhairava composed the music and background score for the film.

References

External links 

 

Upcoming films
Upcoming Telugu-language films
Indian thriller drama films
Upcoming Indian films
Films scored by Kaala Bhairava
Films shot in Hyderabad, India
2022 thriller films